The Saudi Authority for Intellectual Property (SAIP) is an official government body in Saudi Arabia responsible for the protection and supporting the intellectual property in the Kingdom.

Directorates 
SAIP comprises three directorates to accomplish its tasks and objectives. These directorates are:

 The Saudi Patent Office, which is in charge of issuing patents in industrial, commercial, and agricultural fields.
 The Department Of Trademarks, which is responsible for the processing of trademarks applications including the registration and declaration of trademarks.
 The General Administration of Copyrights, which is responsible for issuing and protecting the work produced in literature, art, and sciences field.

Structure 
SAIP is governed by the Board of Directors chaired by Minister of Commerce and Investment and formed by relevant government representatives in addition to three members from non-governmental organizations.

References

External links 
Laws and Regulations

Government agencies of Saudi Arabia